Lepidochrysops littoralis, the coastal blue, is a species of butterfly in the family Lycaenidae. It is endemic to South Africa.

The wingspan is 34–36 mm for males and 36–38 mm for females. Adults are on wing from late August to December.

References

Butterflies described in 1983
Lepidochrysops
Endemic butterflies of South Africa
Taxonomy articles created by Polbot